Succinate-semialdehyde dehydrogenase, mitochondrial is an enzyme that in humans is encoded by the ALDH5A1 gene.

Function 

This protein belongs to the aldehyde dehydrogenase family of proteins. This gene encodes a mitochondrial NAD+-dependent succinic semialdehyde dehydrogenase. A deficiency of this enzyme, known as 4-hydroxybutyricaciduria, is a rare inborn error in the metabolism of the neurotransmitter γ-aminobutyric acid (GABA). In response to the defect, physiologic fluids from patients accumulate GHB, a compound with numerous neuromodulatory properties. Two transcript variants encoding distinct isoforms have been identified for this gene.

References

External links

Further reading